Sondre Holst Enger (born 17 December 1993) is a Norwegian former professional cyclist, who rode professionally between 2012 and 2020 for five different teams. He was named in the start list for the 2016 Tour de France. Upon retiring, Holst Enger announced his intention to become a carpenter.

Major results

2011
 3rd Time trial, National Junior Road Championships
 8th Road race, UEC European Junior Road Championships
 10th Time trial, UCI Junior Road World Championships
 10th Overall GP Denmark
2012
 3rd Ringerike GP
2013
 1st  Road race, National Under-23 Road Championships
 1st  Overall Coupe des nations Ville Saguenay
1st  Points classification
 3rd  Road race, UCI Under-23 Road World Championships
 3rd Overall Tour of Norway
1st  Young rider classification
 3rd Ringerike GP
 6th Hadeland GP
 6th Skive–Løbet
2014
 1st  Road race, National Under-23 Road Championships
 5th Road race, UCI Under-23 Road World Championships
 5th Overall Tour des Fjords
 8th Road race, UEC European Under-23 Road Championships
2015
 1st Stage 1 Tour of Austria
2016
 1st Stage 6 Tour of Croatia
 2nd Overall Tour de Picardie
 3rd Overall Tour of Norway
1st  Points classification
 4th Road race, National Road Championships
 8th EuroEyes Cyclassics
2018
 1st  Points classification Tour of Norway
 2nd Trofeo Porreres–Felanitx–Ses Salines–Campos
 3rd Veenendaal–Veenendaal Classic

Grand Tour general classification results timeline

References

External links

1993 births
Living people
Norwegian male cyclists
European Games competitors for Norway
Cyclists at the 2019 European Games
Carpenters
21st-century Norwegian people